Edward White Benson (14 July 1829 – 11 October 1896) was Archbishop of Canterbury from 1883 until his death. Before this, he was the first Bishop of Truro, serving from 1877 to 1883, and began construction of Truro Cathedral.

He was previously a schoolmaster and was the first Master of Wellington College from 1859 to 1872.

Life 
Edward White Benson was born at Lombard Street in Highgate, Birmingham, on 14 July 1829, the eldest of eight children of chemical manufacturer Edward White Benson senior (26 August 1802 – 7 February 1843) and his wife Harriet Baker Benson (13 June 1805 – 29 May 1850). He was baptised in St Martin in the Bull Ring, Birmingham, on 31 March 1830. The family moved to Wychbold when his father became manager of the British Alkali Works at Stoke Prior, Worcestershire.

From 1840, he was educated at King Edward's School, Birmingham and then Trinity College, Cambridge, where he graduated BA (8th in the Classical tripos) in 1852. At King Edward's, under James Prince Lee, Benson "manifested a deeply religious tone of mind and was fond of sermons".

Cambridge Ghost Society

The Cambridge Association for Spiritual Inquiry, known informally as the Cambridge Ghost Society or the Ghostlie Guild, was founded by Benson and Brooke Foss Westcott in 1851 at Trinity College. Westcott worked as its secretary until 1860. The society collected and investigated reports of ghosts. Other notable members included Alfred Barry and Henry Sidgwick. It has been described as a predecessor of the Society for Psychical Research. According to the Notebooks of Henry James, his source for the novella The Turn of the Screw was the Archbishop of Canterbury (i.e. Benson) at Addington Palace on 10 January 1895.

Schoolmaster at Rugby and Wellington

Benson began his career as a schoolmaster at Rugby School in 1852, and was ordained deacon in 1853 and priest in 1857. In 1859 Benson was chosen by Prince Albert as the first Master of Wellington College, Berkshire, which had recently been built as the nation's memorial to the Duke of Wellington. Benson was largely responsible for establishing Wellington as a leading public school, closely modelled upon Rugby School.

Lincoln and Truro

From 1872 to 1877, he was Chancellor of Lincoln Cathedral. In 1874, he set up Lincoln Theological College.

He was appointed the first Bishop of Truro, where he served from 1877 to 1882. He was consecrated bishop by Archibald Campbell Tait, Archbishop of Canterbury, on St Mark's day, 25 April 1877 at St Paul's Cathedral.
The Diocese of Truro was established in December 1876.  Construction of Truro Cathedral began in 1880 to a design by the Gothic Revival architect John Loughborough Pearson.  From 24 October 1880 until 1887 a temporary wooden building on an adjacent site served as the cathedral. As archbishop, Benson consecrated the cathedral on 3 November 1887.

He founded Truro High School for Girls in 1880.

Archbishop of Canterbury, 1883–1896

In 1883 he was appointed Archbishop of Canterbury.

Five years later Benson avoided the prosecution before a lay tribunal of Edward King, Bishop of Lincoln, under the Public Worship Regulation Act 1874 for six ritual offences by hearing the case in his own archiepiscopal court (inactive since 1699). In his judgement (often called "the Lincoln Judgement"), he found against the bishop on two points, with a proviso as to a third that when performing the manual acts during the prayer of consecration in the Holy Communion service, the priest must stand in a way that is visible to the people.

Benson tried to amalgamate the two Convocations and the new houses of laity into a single assembly.  In 1896 it was established that they could 'unofficially' meet together.

In September of the same year, the papal bull Apostolicae curae, which denied the validity of Anglican orders, was published and Benson had started a reply. He preached his last sermon at St Patrick's Cathedral, Armagh on 27 September: there is a memorial to him in the north aisle there. He was taken ill while attending Sunday service in St Deiniol's Church, Hawarden, Wales, on 11 October 1896, during a visit to the former Prime Minister, William Ewart Gladstone. His death was attributed to heart failure. Three days later his body was put on the train at Sandycroft station to be returned to London.

He was buried at Canterbury Cathedral, in a magnificent tomb located at the western end of the nave. The tomb is emblazoned with the epitaph Benson had chosen: Miserere mei Deus Per crucem et passionem tuam libera me Christe ("Have mercy on me O Christ our God, Through Thy Cross and Passion, deliver thou me").

His work concerning Saint Cyprian, Cyprian: his life, his times, his work, was published posthumously, in the year after his death.

Legacy

Benson is best remembered for devising the Festival of Nine Lessons and Carols, an order first used in Truro Cathedral on Christmas Eve, 1880. Considerably revised by Eric Milner-White for King's College, Cambridge, this service is now broadcast every Christmas around the world.

Benson was the founder of the Church of England Purity Society, an organisation which later merged with the White Cross Army. Alfred Ryder served as a trustee of the organisation.

Benson told Henry James a simple, rather inexpert story he had heard about the ghosts of evil servants who tried to lure young children to their deaths. James recorded the idea in his Notebooks and eventually used it as the starting-point for his classic ghost story, The Turn of the Screw.

The hymn "God Is Working His Purpose Out" was written by Arthur C. Ainger as a tribute to Benson as both were Masters at Eton and Rugby respectively.

In 1914, a boarding house at Wellington College was named in his honour. Benson House carries the emblem of a blue Tudor Rose, and is situated in its own corner of the college grounds.

Personal life 
Benson married his second cousin Mary (Minnie) Sidgwick, the sister of philosopher Henry, when she was 18, having proposed to her when she was 12 and he was 24. The couple had six children. Benson also supervised the education of his younger sister Ada Benson who was left an orphan in 1852.

Their fifth child was the novelist Edward Frederic Benson, best remembered for his Mapp and Lucia novels. Another son was Arthur Christopher Benson, the author of the lyrics to Elgar's "Land of Hope and Glory" and master of Magdalene College, Cambridge. Their sixth and youngest child, Robert Hugh Benson, became a priest in the Church of England before converting to Roman Catholicism and writing many popular novels. Their daughter, Margaret Benson, was an artist, author and Egyptologist. None of the children married; and some appeared to suffer from mental illnesses, possibly bipolar disorder.

After the archbishop's death, his widow set up household with Lucy Tait, daughter of the previous Archbishop of Canterbury, Archibald Campbell Tait. A biography of Mary Benson, using her numerous letters, was published in 2011. It characterised her husband as living "a life of relentless success".

Edward Benson's aunt, his father's maternal half-sister, was the botanical illustrator, Mary Ann Jackson.

Ancestry

The Benson family was of Scandinavian origin with the name of Bjornsen. The Bensons "emerge into history" as an English family in 1348 when John Benson held a "toft" from the Abbey at Swinton-by-Masham in Yorkshire.

Arthur Christopher Benson, the Archbishop's son, wrote a genealogy of his family. He found that "Old" Christopher Benson (born 1703) was the "real founder of the fortunes" of the Benson family having acquired a "good deal" of land. He also "established a large business."

Archbishop Edward White Benson's grandfather was Captain White Benson, of the 6th Regiment of Foot. The Archbishop's seal and the Captain's coat of arms show their branch of the Benson family arms were blazoned: Argent, a quatrefoil between two trefoils slipped in bend sable, between four bendlets gules.

The Archbishop's father was Edward White Benson (born in York in 1802, died at Birmingham Heath in 1843). He was a Fellow of the Royal Botanical Society of Edinburgh and the author of books on education and religion. He was also an inventor whose inventions made "considerable fortunes" for others, but not for him.

Works

References

Sources

Further reading

 
  Reprinted in paperback as 
 Gwen Watkins, E. F. Benson & His Family and Friends (2003)
 G. Palmer, N. Lloyd, Father of the Bensons (1998)
 David Williams, Genesis and Exodus: A Portrait of the Benson Family (1979)

External links

 Bibliographic directory from Project Canterbury
 Archbishop Benson's papers are held at Lambeth Palace Library
 BirminghamNet: Edward White Benson
 Entry on Archbishop Benson in Cassell's Universal Portrait Gallery (1895)

1829 births
1896 deaths
19th-century Anglican archbishops
Alumni of Trinity College, Cambridge
Archbishops of Canterbury
Edward White
Bishops of Truro
Burials at Canterbury Cathedral
Doctors of Divinity
Fellows of Magdalene College, Cambridge
Masters of Wellington College, Berkshire
Members of the Privy Council of the United Kingdom
People educated at King Edward's School, Birmingham
People from Birmingham, West Midlands
People from Crowthorne
People with bipolar disorder
19th-century Anglican theologians